The Kornilov affair, or the Kornilov putsch, was an attempted military coup d'état by the commander-in-chief of the Russian Army, General Lavr Kornilov, from 10–13 September 1917 (O.S., 27–30 August), against the Russian Provisional Government headed by Aleksander Kerensky and the Petrograd Soviet of Soldiers' and Workers' Deputies. The exact details and motivations of the Kornilov affair are unconfirmed due to the general confusion of all parties involved. Many historians have had to piece together varied historical accounts as a result.

Background

Following the "February Revolution" of 8–16 March 1917 (O.S. 23 February – 3 March), the Russian monarchy fell from power, replaced by a Provisional Government whose members came from various liberal and left-wing political parties, some previously represented in the Duma, and others in the Petrograd Soviet. However, the initial wave of support for the Provisional Government amongst the Russian people soon subsided and unrest grew, a result mainly of Russia's continued participation in the First World War and the economic effects of the fighting on Russian society.

The unrest felt by the Russian people reached a peak with the Kerensky Offensive on 15 July 1917 (O.S. 1 July). Kerensky's offensive was meant to boost the morale of the troops and reignite support for Russia's participation in the war. The offensive ended up having the opposite effect. Troops and workers became frustrated with Russia's continued involvement, which led to the July Days revolt.

The "July Days" took place in the Russian capital of Petrograd from 16 to 20 July (O.S. 3 to 7 July) and was a rebellion against the Provisional Government. The demonstrations during the July Days did not alleviate the frustrations of the Russian people and continued unrest throughout that summer sparked calls for more discipline and a stronger, more unified government. Unease also escalated amongst Russia's businessmen and industrialists in the Provisional Government. Support for the restoration of order was strong even amongst the members of the Provisional Government.

Immediately following the July Days, Aleksander Kerensky became prime minister of the Provisional Government and swiftly appointed Kornilov the commander-in-chief of the Russian Army. With the help of officers of the Russian Army, Kornilov amongst them, he hoped to deliver a more unified form of government. The officers feared that ill-discipline amongst their troops accounted for the continued poor performance of the Russian Army in the war. They demanded the reintroduction of the death penalty on the front line as well as the abolition of the various soldiers' committees that had sprung up in the months following the Petrograd Soviet's Order Number 1 on 28 March 1917 (O.S. 14 March). The officers, especially Kornilov, wanted to put an end to any signs of revolution in Russia, particularly in regard to the Bolsheviks. Kornilov mobilized his troops to Petrograd to address the revolutionary threat shortly after he was appointed commander-in-chief.

The affair 
While there have been multiple conflicting opinions on the specifics of how this event had come to be, as well as how it was carried out, one common fact was that, to "restore peace in Petrograd", Kornilov had been organizing a force of soldiers to move into Petrograd and eliminate the Soviet. Whether Kornilov had done this as a means of imposing a military dictatorship after his success, or was simply acting under Kerensky's orders, is not clear, but what is definite was that Kerensky had no intention of allowing Kornilov to enter Petrograd with an army, fearing the former possibility. In an effort to avoid this, on 10 September 1917 (O.S. 27 August), Kerensky had sent Kornilov a telegram informing him of his dismissal and ordering him to return to Petrograd. The telegram did not impede Kornilov's progress towards Petrograd as intended, but instead most likely hastened his troops' advance as Kornilov, after reading the message, assumed that Petrograd had fallen under the control of the Bolsheviks.

Kornilov had the support of the British military attaché, Brigadier-General Alfred Knox, and Kerensky accused Knox of producing pro-Kornilov propaganda. Kerensky also claimed Lord Milner wrote him a letter expressing support for Kornilov. A British armoured car squadron commanded by Oliver Locker-Lampson and dressed in Russian uniforms allegedly participated in the coup.

Over the course of the next few days, as the Provisional Government tried to come up with a concrete plan to avert the oncoming attack, the Petrograd Soviet had taken measures to defend against Kornilov's advancing troops. One of these measures was the creation of the Committee for Struggle Against Counterrevolution on 11 September 1917 (28 August Old Style). Those participating in the committee were representatives of the two national soviet executive committees of workers and soldiers and of peasants, the Petrograd Soviet, the General Central Council of Trade Unions, and the Social Revolutionary (S. R.) and Menshevik parties. The most notable members of this committee were the Bolsheviks, who had a large support base among the lower class, and included Bolshevik organizers such as Leon Trotsky, who had been previously imprisoned but released at the behest of the Petrograd Soviet to assist in the organization of the defense of Petrograd.

The Soviet had performed several acts such as working with rail worker unions to impede Kornilov's army's progress towards Petrograd as well as infiltrating the army for the purpose of sabotage and convincing soldiers within the force to desert, all in an effort to halt and weaken the forces of Kornilov. In Petrograd the Soviet, most notably the Bolsheviks for reasons that were important later on, were given ammunition and arms in the event that Kornilov's troops should arrive at Petrograd and combat be necessary. However this proved unnecessary because by 13 September 1917 (30 August Old Style) Kornilov's army had lost a large number of soldiers and with no more support for Kornilov's movement the affair had come to a bloodless end.

Consequences

After the failed coup, Kornilov was removed from his position as Commander-in-Chief and incarcerated in the Bykhov Fortress alongside 30 other army officers accused of involvement in the conspiracy. The Provisional Government had lost all credibility and crumbled. Shortly after Lenin seized power with the Bolshevik October Revolution of 7 November 1917 (25 October old style) Kornilov managed to escape from Bykhov Fortress and went on to establish the Volunteer Army, which fought the Bolsheviks during the Russian Civil War. He was killed in battle against Bolshevik forces in the town of Ekaterinodar in April 1918.

The biggest beneficiary of the Kornilov affair was the Bolshevik Party, who enjoyed a revival in support and strength in the wake of the attempted coup. Kerensky released Bolsheviks who had been arrested during the July Days a few months earlier, when Vladimir Lenin was accused of being in the pay of the Germans and subsequently fled to Finland. Kerensky's plea to the Petrograd Soviet for support had resulted in the rearmament of the Bolshevik Military Organization and the release of Bolshevik political prisoners, including Leon Trotsky. Though these weapons were not needed to fight off Kornilov's advancing troops in August, they were kept by the Bolsheviks and used in their own successful armed October Revolution. Bolshevik support amongst the Russian public also increased following the Kornilov affair, a consequence of dissatisfaction with the Provisional Government's handling of Kornilov's attempted seizure of power. Following the October Revolution, Lenin and the Bolsheviks seized power and the Provisional Government that Kornilov was a part of ceased to exist. The fragments of the Provisional Government were a pivotal force in the Russian Civil War that occurred in response to Lenin's seizure of power.

Despite the officer corps' refusal to participate in Kornilov's mutiny, they were angry with the punishment given to him by Kerensky, as well as Kerensky's accommodation of the left and his arrest of prominent generals. This would later come back to haunt Kerensky as the military did not heed his request to defend the government when the Bolsheviks attacked in the October Revolution in 1917.

Historiography

Several schools of thought surrounding the Kornilov affair offer contrasting interpretations and have provoked debate among historians. Mark D. Steinberg presents the conflicting beliefs and political opinions on the Kornilov Affair. He elaborates by stating that the event was "a strange mixture of conspiracy and confusion". Once the attempt was halted, many citizens expressed skeptical thoughts regarding what actually happened between Kornilov and Kerensky. On the left side, those who defended Kornilov believed that Kerensky had intentionally planned the seizure of power, but publicly disapproved of it to be the savior figure in the midst of turmoil. Another aspect that Steinberg highlights is that the right believed that Kerensky had turned against Kornilov. Thus, the opinions regarding this affair further perpetuated separation between the right and left political parties.

When discussing the events that led up to the affair, Steinberg analyzes the involvement of former Provisional Government minister Vladimir Nikolaevich Lvov. Prior to the affair taking place, Lvov identified himself to Kornilov as an "emissary for the prime minister," which was not his true occupation. Through his interaction with Kornilov, Lvov gained the knowledge that Kornilov wanted to create a stronger, more unified government where he had more of a voice. Then, Lvov went on to express these desires to Kerensky, but Kerensky viewed this information as a threatening proposal to take over the government. From there, Kerensky prepared to defend the capital against Kornilov's advancing troops and aspirations of gaining power. It can be considered that, through communicating with the help of Lvov, the different intentions of both Kornilov and Kerensky were miscommunicated or misrepresented in conversation, which perpetuated the attempted government seizure of power.

One take on the Kornilov affair was put forward by Aleksander Kerensky himself, the main target of the coup. In the years after the event, Kerensky described the affair as a right-wing conspiracy that "...developed slowly, systematically, with cool calculation of all the factors involved affecting its possible success or failure." Kornilov, on the other hand, argued that Kerensky was drawn into this conspiracy long after the preparatory work had been completed. In a 1966 interview with Soviet journalist Genrikh Borovik, Kerensky further elaborated on his theory by stating that Winston Churchill had played a central role in the conspiracy.

In 1970 Harvey Asher, who received his doctorate in history and pursued research into the Russian Revolution, suggested that Kerensky and Kornilov had an agreement to use the military to restore order within Russia. Asher then goes on to argue that, upon learning from Lvov that Kornilov favoured the idea of a military dictatorship, Kerensky reneged on their agreement in fear of being removed from power.

According to the British historian John Keegan, Kornilov was maneuvered by others into attempting the coup, but he does not say who those others were. An earlier historian, AJP Taylor, believed that Kerensky encouraged the coup until he realized that Kornilov intended to destroy both the Bolsheviks and any trace of democracy including Kerensky himself.

The American historian Richard Pipes put forward another interpretation of the event in his work The Russian Revolution: 1899–1919. Pipes argued that, far from there being a Kornilov plot, there was in fact a "'Kerensky plot' engineered to discredit the general as the ringleader of an imaginary but widely anticipated counter-revolution, the suppression of which would elevate the Prime Minister to a position of unrivalled popularity and power, enabling him to meet the growing threat from the Bolsheviks."

See also 
 Ivan Zaplatin
 Kapp Putsch

References

Further reading
 
 
 
 
 
 
 
 Steinberg, M. D. (2001). Voices of Revolution, 1917. New Haven, CT: Yale University Press.
 Steinberg, M. D. (2017). The Russian Revolution, 1905–1921. United Kingdom: Oxford University Press.
 
 

Russian Revolution
Attempted coups in Russia
1910s coups d'état and coup attempts
Military history of Russia
Political history of Russia
Russian Provisional Government
August 1917 events